John Anthony McGuckin (born 1952) is a British theologian, church historian, Orthodox Christian priest and poet.

Education
McGuckin attended Heythrop College from 1970 to 1972, graduated from the University of London with a divinity degree in 1975, a Certificate in Education from the University of Newcastle upon Tyne in 1979, his Ph.D. from Durham University in 1980, and an M.A. in educational studies from the University of Southampton in 1986.

Professional life and affiliations 

McGuckin was a Reader in Patristic and Byzantine theology at the University of Leeds. McGuckin was the Nielsen Professor of Early Church History at Union Theological Seminary and Professor of Byzantine Christian Studies at Columbia University in New York City.

He is an archpriest of the Romanian Orthodox Church and rector of the Orthodox Church in Lytham St. Annes, England. He currently serves on the faculty of church history at Oxford University, and is a fellow of the Royal Historical Society of the United Kingdom.

He has written books on Church Fathers such as Cyril of Alexandria, Gregory of Nazianzus and Origen, among others. His work includes New Testament interpretation, patristics, the history of the Byzantine Empire, and Orthodox theology. He is a scholar of Eastern Christian history.

He is a fellow of both the Royal Society of Arts and the Royal Historical Society. He is director of the Sophia Institute: International Center for Orthodox Thought and Culture, which has its offices on the Union Seminary campus in Manhattan. In 1992 he was given the award of the Brotherhood of Peter Mohyla for his educational services at the Mohyla Academy in the newly independent Ukraine and gave a course of lectures in Patristic theology in the academy buildings after they had been taken back from the possession of the Naval Academy. He was awarded the Jeweled Cross of Moldavia and Bukovina by Romanian Patriarch Daniel in 2007 for his services to the church and the academy. On 31 January 2014, McGuckin was awarded the Jeweled Cross by Metropolitan Tikhon of Washington for his services to church and academy. On the occasion of his delivering the 31st Annual Schmemann lecture at St. Vladimir's in 2014 he was awarded the Doctorate of Divinity Honoris Causa and in 2015 he received an honorary doctorate from the Andrei Saguna School of Theology at Sibiu's Lucian Blaga University.

Works

Books
 
 
 
 
 
 
  - nominated for the 2002 Pollock Biography Prize

Edited by

References

External links
Curriculum Vitae : Revd. Professor John Anthony McGuckin.
Faculty page at Union Seminary
The Road to Nicaea —one of his essays, a description of to Council
The 31st Annual Schmemann lecture at St. Vladimir's, 2014

Converts to Eastern Orthodoxy from Roman Catholicism
1952 births
Living people
Columbia University faculty
Alumni of Newcastle University
Alumni of Heythrop College
Alumni of Durham University
Alumni of the University of Southampton
Fellows of the Royal Historical Society
Eastern Orthodox Christians from the United Kingdom
20th-century British Roman Catholic priests
20th-century Eastern Orthodox priests
21st-century Eastern Orthodox priests
Academics of the University of Leeds